The cyclically adjusted price-to-earnings ratio, commonly known as CAPE, Shiller P/E, or P/E 10 ratio, is a valuation measure usually applied to the US S&P 500 equity market. It is defined as price divided by the average of ten years of earnings (moving average), adjusted for inflation. As such, it is principally used to assess likely future returns from equities over timescales of 10 to 20 years, with higher than average CAPE values implying lower than average long-term annual average returns. 
 The ratio was invented by American economist Robert J. Shiller.

The ratio is used to gauge whether a stock, or group of stocks, is undervalued or overvalued by comparing its current market price to its inflation-adjusted historical earnings record.

It is a variant of the more popular price to earning ratio and is calculated by dividing the current price of a stock by its average inflation-adjusted earnings over the last 10 years.

Using average earnings over the last decade helps to smooth out the impact of business cycles and other events and gives a better picture of a company's sustainable earning power.

It is not intended as an indicator of impending market crashes, although high CAPE values have been associated with such events.

Background

Value investors Benjamin Graham and David Dodd argued for smoothing a firm's earnings over the past five to ten years in their classic text Security Analysis. Graham and Dodd noted one-year earnings were too volatile to offer a good idea of a firm's true earning power. In a 1988 paper  economists John Y. Campbell and Robert Shiller concluded that "a long moving average of real earnings helps to forecast future real dividends" which in turn are correlated with returns on stocks. The idea is to take a long-term average of earnings (typically 5 or 10 year) and adjust for inflation to forecast future returns.  The long term average smooths out short term volatility of earnings and medium-term business cycles in the general economy and they thought it was a better reflection of a firm's long term earning power.

From the 1940s, Sir John Templeton used a method adapted from Graham and Dodd, and somewhat similar to the later Shiller P/E, but with the Dow Jones Industrial Index. 

Shiller later popularized the 10-year version of Graham and Dodd's P/E as a way to value the stock market as measured by the S&P 500.  Shiller would share the Nobel Memorial Prize in Economic Sciences in 2013 for his work in the empirical analysis of asset prices.

Use in forecasting future returns
Using market data from both estimated (1881–1956) and actual (1957 onward) earnings reports from the S&P index, Shiller and Campbell found that the lower the CAPE, the higher the investors' likely return from equities over the following 20 years. The average CAPE value for the 20th century was 15.21; this corresponds to an average annual return over the next 20 years of around 6.6 per cent. CAPE values above this produce corresponding lower returns, and vice versa. In 2014, Shiller expressed concern that the prevailing CAPE of over 25 was "a level that has been surpassed since 1881 in only three previous periods: the years clustered around 1929, 1999 and 2007. Major market drops followed those peaks" (ref 4). A high CAPE ratio has been linked to the phrase "irrational exuberance" and to Shiller's book of the same name. After Fed President Alan Greenspan coined the term in 1996, the CAPE ratio reached an all-time high during the 2000 dot-com bubble.  It also reached a historically high level again during the housing bubble up to 2007 before the crash of the great recession.

However, Shiller's views on what CAPE value is a predictor of poor returns have been criticized as overly pessimistic and based on the original definition of CAPE, which fails to take into account changes in accounting standards in 1990s, which, according to Jeremy Siegel, produce understated earnings.

The measure exhibits a significant amount of variation over time, and has been criticized as "not always accurate in signaling market tops or bottoms". One proposed reason for this time variation is that CAPE does not take into account prevailing risk-free interest rates. A common debate is whether the inverse CAPE ratio should be further divided by the yield on 10 year Treasuries.  This debate regained currency in 2014 as the CAPE ratio reached an all-time high in combination with historically very low rates on 10 year Treasuries.

CAPE for other equity markets
Originally derived for the US equity market, the CAPE has since been calculated for 15 other markets. Research by Norbert Keimling has demonstrated that the same relation between CAPE and future equity returns exists in every equity market so far examined. Research by others has also found CAPE ratios are reliable in estimating market returns over five to ten year periods in many international stock markets.

It also suggests that comparison of CAPE values can assist in identifying the best markets for future equity returns beyond the US market.

See also 
 Price–earnings ratio

References

External links
Robert J. Shiller's data page "ONLINE DATA ROBERT SHILLER"

Valuation (finance)
Financial ratios